Jewish Historical Museum may refer to:

 Joods Historisch Museum, Amsterdam
 Jewish Historical Museum, Belgrade
 Saint John Jewish Historical Museum